Fortuna Union High School or FUHS, is a public high school in Fortuna, California, serves a large area of the midsection of Humboldt County.  Despite this, enrollment is down from a recent high of 1,159 in 2000–01 to 844 in 2013–2014.

The FUHS website, lists three campus locations for schools in the Fortuna Unified High School District: Fortuna High School, East High Fortuna and Academy of the Redwoods.

History
The Fortuna Union High School was established on July 1, 1905.

In August 2020, Fortuna High School was the first large-population school on the North Coast to reopen campus and resume face to face instruction during the COVID-19 pandemic.

Academic programs
Academic programs at Fortuna High School include: Career and Technology Education, English, Mathematics, Physical Education, Science, Social Sciences, Spanish and Visual and Performing Arts.

Athletics
Athletic programs at FUHS include:
Baseball
Basketball
Cheerleading
Cross Country
Football
Soccer
Softball
Tennis (Men's and Women's)
Track and Field
Volleyball
Wrestling

Mascot and school colors
The school mascot is the Husky (dog) and the colors are royal blue and white.

Milk Can Rivalry
The boys football team has a long-standing rivalry with the adjacent town of Ferndale, California.  The winner of the annual game takes home a milk can labeled with the years and scores of the winning and losing teams.

Notable alumni
Randy Niemann, former Major League Baseball pitcher and coach

References

External links
 The Husky Handbook
 Ed-Data

High schools in Humboldt County, California
Public high schools in California
Educational institutions established in 1905
1905 establishments in California